Lloyd Alva Anderson (August 4, 1902 – September 13, 2000) was an American business executive who co-founded the retail and outdoor recreation services corporation REI in 1938 with his wife Mary Anderson. As avid mountaineers they saw a need for quality gear so created a consumer cooperative company that is one of the largest 
recreational equipment retailers. They were inducted into the Cooperative Business Association's Hall of Fame in 1993.

Family life
Anderson was born to John Anderson and Adda Wilson Bush Anderson in Roy, Washington. He studied at University of Washington, earning a BS in electrical engineering and worked for Seattle's transit utility. He died in 2000.

Publications
Lloyd Anderson's Climbing Notebook (1980)
Copyright Registration Number/Date: TXu000053476 / 1980-10-03
The History of Recreational Equipment, Inc.--a Cooperative (1980) Copyright Registration Number/Date: TXu000043397 / 1980-05-05

First ascents
Anderson's first ascents include Mount Triumph (1938), Sinister Peak (1939), Forbidden Peak (1940), Tenpeak Mountain (1940), Klawatti Peak (1940), and Dorado Needle (1940).

References

External links
Lloyd Anderson papers, (1929-1979 at University of Washington Libraries
The Mountaineer, 1938
The Mountaineer, 1940
The Mountaineer, 1941
The Mountaineer, 1947
REI.com

1902 births
2000 deaths
American mountain climbers
University of Washington alumni